The 2015 Carling Black Label Cup was the fifth edition of the Carling Black Label Cup to be held.

A South African beer brand Black Label started the “Be The Coach” where the fans had the opportunity to elect the starting 11 of their desired players from the two Soweto derby arch rivals, Orlando Pirates, and Kaizer Chiefs, which are two of the most successful and largest soccer clubs in South Africa.

Orlando Pirates defeated Kaizer Chiefs 4-3 on penalties after the game finished 1-1, with Tendai Ndoro scoring the winning kick for Pirates.

Venue
The FNB Stadium was chosen to host this once a year event. The FNB Stadium, known as Soccer City during the 2010 FIFA World Cup, is a stadium located in Nasrec, the Soweto area of Johannesburg, South Africa.

Match

Details

References

Soccer cup competitions in South Africa
Carling